

The Letov L-101 was an airliner designed in Czechoslovakia shortly after the end of the Second World War. It was to have been a 12-seat twin-engine feederliner, built using German engines left over from Czechoslovakia's occupation. The Letov factory was nationalised on 24 October 1945, and the L-101 was its first project, along with finishing work on the Junkers Ju 290.

As designed, the L-101 was a conventional cantilever low-wing monoplane. The structure throughout was to be of metal, and skinned in metal except for fabric covering for the rudder and elevators. The tailwheel undercarriage was fully retractable, with the main units retracting rearwards into the engine nacelles. The flight crew of two had a flight deck separate from the passenger cabin.

However, following the Communist coup of 1948, the various Czechoslovakian aircraft and automotive manufacturers were amalgamated under CZAL, and work on the L-101 project did not proceed under the new regime.

Specifications (as designed)

References

 
 

1940s Czechoslovakian airliners
Letov aircraft
Twin piston-engined tractor aircraft